Lebanon High School is a public high school in Lebanon, Ohio. It is the only high school in the Lebanon City School District. Their mascot is the Warrior and the school logo is the letter "L" with a spear. The primary school colors are maroon and white, although throughout its history secondary colors have included black and maize. The school's principal is Mr. Casey Wood (Interim). The high school currently houses approximately 1,650 students and the district's total student population is just over 6,000.

The high school moved into its current building on 1916 Drake Road in 2004. From 1969 until 2004 it was housed in what was Lebanon Junior High School on 160 Miller Road. Prior to 1969, Lebanon High School called home what is now Berry Intermediate School on Oakwood Street.

The current high school is in the second phase of a three-phase building plan. The third phase include an auditorium and additional classroom space. The current building has over 2,200 pieces of technology equipment, science labs, a media center room, a writing lab, video distribution center, and band and choral facilities.

Also included at the high school are two collegiate-sized gyms (including a competition gym), health and fitness centers, and practice facilities for many competitive teams.

Athletics
Lebanon High School currently offers 11 men's sports and 11 women's sports. The athletic program is a member of the Eastern Cincinnati Conference  (ECC), which consists of teams in the Eastern Cincinnati area. From 1997 to 2003, Lebanon participated in the Fort Ancient Valley Conference.  Lebanon has also been a member of the Mid-Miami League (MML) and the Greater Western Ohio Conference (GWOC).

Ohio High School State championships
Team
Division II
Football – 1998
Individual
Division I
 Girls Cross Country – 2012, Jacquelyn Crow
 Boys Track – 2010, 4x100 Relay: Chase Cochran, Luke Norris, Trey Bonny & Steven Gabbard
Individual Division II

 Wrestling – John Noble, 1990 (112) & 1992 (119); Shawn Enright, 1992 (125); Jon Holman, 1988 (152)
 Girls Track – 1993, Ann Worley, High Jump

Team Non-OHSAA
 Boys Volleyball – 1995 & 1996 (club sport)

Notable alumni
 Brett Harrelson, actor
 Woody Harrelson, (1979) actor
 Casey Shaw, basketball player

See also

 Lebanon School District
 Lebanon, Ohio

References

External links
 District Website

High schools in Warren County, Ohio
Public high schools in Ohio
2004 establishments in Ohio